Telstar 302 was a geostationary communication satellite built by Hughes, it was located at orbital position of 85 degrees west longitude and was operated by AT&T. The satellite was based on the HS-376 platform and its life expectancy was 10 years. Telstar 302 left service on September 5, 1997. The satellite was successfully launched into space on August 30, 1984, at 12:41:50 UTC, aboard the Space Shuttle Discovery during the STS-41D mission from the Kennedy Space Center in Florida, United States, Along with the SBS 4 satellites and Leasat 2. It had a launch mass of 1,140 kg.

Telstar 302 was equipped with 24 C band transponders to provide telecommunication service to North America (including U.S. state of Hawaii and Puerto Rico).

References

Spacecraft launched in 1984
AT&T buildings
Communications satellites in geostationary orbit
Telstar satellites
Satellites using the HS-376 bus